Bharatiya Janata Party Information Technology Cell commonly known as 'BJP IT Cell' or 'BJP Social Media Cell' is a department of the party to manage social media campaigns for the Bharatiya Janata Party (BJP).

History 
BJP was the first political party in India to acknowledge and use the power of social media in mobilizing public opinion. The twitter account for BJP leader Narendra Modi (then Chief Minister of Gujarat) was created in 2009. In contrast the twitter account of senior Congress leader Rahul Gandhi was made in 2015.

Organization 
Amit Malviya is the incharge of BJP IT Cell.

Methods 
BJP orchestrates online campaigns through its social media cell to intimidate perceived government critics. Sadhavi Khosla, a BJP cyber-volunteer in the BJP IT Cell said that the organization disseminated misogyny, Islamophobia and hatred. The network of volunteers of BJP take instructions from BJP IT Cell and two affiliated organisations to troll users who are critical of BJP. Journalists and Indian film actors are also among their targets.

In November 2015, a Muslim film actor from India, Aamir Khan expressed concern about rising intolerance in India in response to political events in India that included violent attacks against Muslims and intellectuals, and the absence of swift or strong condemnation from the country's ruling Bharatiya Janata Party (BJP) Modi government. Khosla said that BJP responded with an online campaigns through its social media cell to intimidate Khan. Khan advertised for Snapdeal. Modi supporters bombarded the company with orders and later cancelled them. The campaign led to Snapdeal dropping Khan for its advertisement.

Prime Minister Narendra Modi personally follows several Twitter accounts known for sending abusive social media messages. Ministers of his Union Cabinet have also endorsed some of them. 
Derek O'Brien (politician), a member of Parliament had raised the topic in  raised the topic in Rajya Sabha, India’s upper house. He had questioned why Narendra Modi followed cyber-bullies on social media. O'Brien  had said "We are mainstreaming hate". He also asked if Modi administration would issue advisory asking government officials to stop following Twitter users that regularly send abusive messages and obscenities. Government had not answered the question.

In December 2020, Twitter took restrictive action against Amit Malviya, IT Cell in charge, and tagged his post as 'manipulated media'. This was the first time Twitter took restrictive action against an Indian political personality. Malviya had posted an edited video of an incident from 2020–2021 Indian farmers' protest that violated Twitter policy towards fighting the spread of doctored media.

References

Citations

Further reading
  
 

Bharatiya Janata Party